The Jeanneau Beniguet is a French trailerable sailboat that was designed as a day sailer and pocket cruiser, first built in 1970.

Production
The design was built by Jeanneau in France, starting in 1970, but it is now out of production.

Design
The Beniguet is a recreational keelboat, built predominantly of fiberglass, with wood trim. It has a fractional sloop rig. The hull has a raked stem, an angled transom, a transom-hung rudder controlled by a tiller and a fixed long keel. It displaces  and carries  of ballast.

When new, the boat could be factory optionally equipped with a diesel inboard engine for docking and maneuvering.

The design has sleeping accommodation for two people, with a double "V"-berth in the cabin.

See also
List of sailing boat types

References

External links

Keelboats
1970s sailboat type designs
Sailing yachts
Trailer sailers
Sailboat types built by Jeanneau